Paul Lerme (13 March 1902 – 23 April 1978) was a French racing cyclist. He rode in the 1928 Tour de France.

References

1902 births
1978 deaths
French male cyclists
Place of birth missing